First Fork Sinnemahoning Creek  is a tributary of Sinnemahoning Creek in the U.S. state of Pennsylvania.

Course and tributaries
Freeman Run joins the First Fork at the community of Costello, Potter County. (The former municipality of East Fork, dissolved in 2004, took its name from this tributary.)

The dam creates the George B. Stevenson Reservoir, a  lake constructed by the Commonwealth of Pennsylvania in 1955 as part of the flood control project on the West Branch Susquehanna River. It is one of four such dams in the river basin. The other reservoirs are at Kettle Creek State Park, Curwensville and Bald Eagle State Park.

The reservoir is open to some recreational boating, fishing and ice fishing. Gas-powered motors are prohibited; motorized boats must be powered by electric motors only. Sailboats, rowboats, canoes, kayaks, and paddleboats are permitted on the waters of the lake. All boats must be properly registered with any state. The reservoir is open to ice fishing during the winter months when the lake is frozen.

See also
List of rivers of Pennsylvania

References

External links
U.S. Geological Survey: PA stream gaging stations

Rivers of Pennsylvania
Tributaries of the West Branch Susquehanna River
Rivers of Potter County, Pennsylvania
Rivers of Cameron County, Pennsylvania